The European Journal of Social Theory is a quarterly peer-reviewed academic journal that covers all aspects social theory. The editor-in-chief is Gerard Delanty (University of Sussex). The journal was established in 1998 and is published by SAGE Publications.

Abstracting and indexing 
The journal is abstracted and indexed in:

According to the Journal Citation Reports, its 2019 impact factor is 2.333.

References

External links 
 

SAGE Publishing academic journals
English-language journals
Quarterly journals
Publications established in 1998
Sociology journals